The Goadec Sisters (Ar C'hoarezed Goadeg in Breton) usually known as Les sœurs Goadec in French, were a Breton vocal group originating from Treffrin (Côtes d'Armor, France). The trio embody the traditional music of Brittany, singing a cappella. The three sisters were Maryvonne (1900-1983), Eugenie (1909-2003) and Anastasie Goadec (1913-1998). They began to perform at fest-noz (evening dances) in 1956, among the pipers and bombard players. Accompanied until 1964 by their two sisters, Louise (1903-1964) and Ernestine (1911-1964), their repertoire consisted mainly of laments (Gwerzioù in Breton). As a trio, they attempted to adapt their singing to dance and developed a new form of call and response singing (kan ha diskan).

The Breton revival, Celtic rock and the popularity of Folk music put them in the spotlight in 1972–1973, in the wake of Alan Stivell, one of their biggest admirers. The three sisters contributed much to Breton culture and its sustainability. Over several recordings they transmitted a vast repertoire of songs and techniques specific to Breton folk singing.

Annie Ebrel is a second cousin of Louise Ebrel, who is a daughter of Eugénie Goadec.

See also
 Louise Ebrel
 Annie Ebrel

References

Links 
 Discogs

Breton-language singers
Sibling musical trios